The 2004 World Cup of Hockey was an international ice hockey tournament. It was the second installment of the National Hockey League (NHL)-sanctioned competition, eight years after the inaugural 1996 World Cup of Hockey. It was held from August 30 to September 14, 2004, and took place in various venues in North America and Europe. Canada won the championship, defeating Finland in the final, held in Toronto.

The tournament directly preceded the NHL lockout, as the NHL announced they were locking out players during 2004–05 season two days after the tournament final was played, pending the adoption of a new Collective Bargaining Agreement.

Team participants

Venues

 North American pool and quarterfinals, semifinals and final

 Air Canada Centre – Toronto, Ontario, Canada
 Bell Centre – Montreal, Quebec, Canada
 Xcel Energy Center – St. Paul, Minnesota, U.S.

 European pool and quarterfinals

 Globen – Stockholm, Sweden
 Hartwall Areena – Helsinki, Finland
 Kölnarena – Cologne, Germany
 Sazka Arena – Prague, Czech Republic

Pre-tournament games

 Russia–Germany 3–3 (Cologne)
 Sweden–Slovakia 2–0 (Bratislava)
 Finland–Czech Republic 1–1 (Prague)
 Canada–United States 1–3 (Columbus)
 Finland–Sweden 1–2 OT (Stockholm)
 Czech Republic–Germany 7–4 (Cologne)
 United States–Canada 1–3 (Ottawa)
 Germany–Finland 2–4 (Helsinki)
 Sweden–Czech Republic 3–5 (Prague)
 Russia–United States 0–2 (Columbus)
 Slovakia–Canada 2–2 (Ottawa)
 Slovakia–Russia 0–0 (Ottawa)

Preliminary round

North American pool

All times are local (UTC-5 / UTC-4).

European pool

All times are local (UTC+2 / UTC+3).

Playoff round

Bracket

Quarter-finals
All times are local (UTC+3 / UTC+2 / UTC-5 / UTC-4).

Semi-finals
All times are local (UTC-5 / UTC-4).

Final
Time is Eastern Daylight-Saving Time (UTC-4).

Ranking and statistics

Tournament awards
Tournament MVP
 Vincent Lecavalier
All-star team
Goaltender:  Martin Brodeur
Defence:  Adam Foote,  Kimmo Timonen
Forwards:  Vincent Lecavalier,  Saku Koivu,  Fredrik Modin

Final standings

Scoring leaders

Leading goaltenders

See also
 International Ice Hockey Federation
 National Hockey League
 Summit Series
 World Cup of Hockey
 World Professional Hockey Championships
 1996 World Cup of Hockey
 2004 World Cup of Hockey statistics

References

External links
 ESPN World Cup of Hockey page
 TSN's World Cup of Hockey page
 CBC's World Cup of Hockey page
 International Hockey Statistics Database
  Series du Sommet (série du siècle), Coupe Canada et Coupe du Monde

 
World Cup of Hockey
2004–05 in Canadian ice hockey
2004–05 in American ice hockey
2004–05 in Czech ice hockey
2004–05 in Finnish ice hockey
2004–05 in Russian ice hockey
2004–05 in German ice hockey
2004–05 in Swedish ice hockey
Ice hockey competitions in Toronto
2004 in Ontario
August 2004 sports events
September 2004 sports events
International sports competitions in Toronto